The Convent of San Plácido (Spanish: Convento de San Plácido) is a convent located in Madrid, Spain. It was declared Bien de Interés Cultural in 1943.

The interior of the church was decorated including frescoes in the ceiling of the main chapel by Francisco Rizi and Juan Martín Cabezalero. In the retable of the main altar is an Annunciation by Claudio Coello. The church features sculptures by Manuel Pereira and Gregorio Fernández (Dead Christ).

References 

Convents in Spain
Buildings and structures in Universidad neighborhood, Madrid
Bien de Interés Cultural landmarks in Madrid